Neill Barry (born November 29, 1965) is an American film, television and stage actor, as well as an occasional screenwriter.

Barry was born in New York City, New York. He made his acting debut at the age of thirteen in Martin Davidson's film Hero at Large.  He co-wrote and starred in the independent film Friends & Lovers, which also starred Robert Downey Jr., Claudia Schiffer and Stephen Baldwin.

Barry portrays Philip Rearden in Atlas Shrugged (2011), the film adaptation of Ayn Rand's novel of the same name.

Selected film and television work

Film

Hero at Large (1980) - Teenager
Amityville 3-D (1983) - Jeff
Old Enough (1984) - Johnny
O.C. and Stiggs (1985) - Mark Stiggs
Heat (1986) - Danny DeMarco
Joey (1986) - Joey
Fatal Beauty (1987) - Denny Miflin
Slipping Into Darkness (1988) - Ebin
She's So Lovely (1998) - Mario
Show & Tell (1998) - Michael
Friends & Lovers (1999) - Keaton McCarthy (also co-wrote)
Atlas Shrugged (2011) - Philip Rearden

Television

Murder, She Wrote - (1992) Richie Floret
Melrose Place (1996) - Greg Parker
7th Heaven (1998) - Louis Dalton Jr.
CSI: NY (2006) - Salvador Zabo
Crossing Jordan (2007) - Jack Marshall
Without a Trace (2007) - Prof. Arrow
General Hospital: Night Shift (2008) - Will
Criminal Minds (2009) - Downey
House M.D. (2011) - Donald

Broadway stage performances
Almost an Eagle (1982) - Shawn Haley

References

External links

1965 births
Male actors from New York City
American male film actors
American male screenwriters
American male stage actors
American male television actors
Living people
Screenwriters from New York (state)